, formerly , is a Japanese singer, famous for singing the ending themes used in the Fatal Frame series: "Chō" for Fatal Frame II: Crimson Butterfly, and "Koe" for Fatal Frame III: The Tormented. She also sang two songs for Fatal Frame: Mask of the Lunar Eclipse, "Zero no Chōritsu" and "Noise," and sang the song "Torikago -in this cage-" for Fatal Frame: Maiden of Black Water.

Biography 
Amano started playing music at the age of 5, when she started taking piano lessons. She was part of her junior high school chorus club as a soprano, and in high school she began to experiment with various musical instruments and joined the theatre group. It was also in high school where she bought her very first guitar, which is now her primary instrument.

Many of Amano's songs have been used as theme songs for commercials, television shows, movies, and video games. Besides writing all of her own songs, Amano also designs and makes most of the costumes in her videos and performances herself. She has published a storybook she wrote while recording her Ningyō video.

On January 10, 2010, she announced she would be returning to music.

Discography

As Tsukiko Amano

Singles (Indies)

Singles (Major label)

Albums

As Tsuki Amano

Singles 

Digital Singles

Albums 

Other Albums

Mini-Albums

References

External links 

  
Official blog 
Official English blog
 

Japanese women rock singers
Year of birth missing (living people)
Living people
Pony Canyon artists
Alternative rock singers
Fatal Frame
21st-century Japanese singers
21st-century Japanese women singers